Ernst Leopold of Hesse-Rotenburg  (15 June 1684 – 29 November 1749) was Landgrave of Hessen-Rheinfels-Rotenburg between 1725 and 1749.

Born in Langenschwalbach, he was a son of landgrave William, Landgrave of Hesse-Rotenburg and Countess Maria Anna of Löwenstein-Wertheim-Rochefort (1652–1688).

He died in Rotenburg in 1749.

Marriage and issue
He married his first cousin Eleonore of Löwenstein-Wertheim (1686–1753), in Frankfurt, on 9 November 1704. They had ten children:

 Joseph, Hereditary Prince of Hesse-Rotenburg (1705–1744); married Princess Christina of Salm had issue.
 Polyxena of Hesse-Rotenburg, Queen of Sardinia (1706–1735); married Charles Emmanuel III of Sardinia had issue.
 Landgravine Magdalene Leopoldina of Hesse-Rotenburg (1707–1708); died in infancy.
 Wilhelm of Hesse-Rotenburg (1708); died in infancy.
 Sophie of Hesse-Rotenburg (1709–1711); died in infancy.
 Franciscus Alexander of Hesse-Rotenburg (1710–1739); died unmarried.
 Eleonora of Hesse-Rotenburg (1712–1759); married John Christian, Count Palatine of Sulzbach, no issue.
 Landgravine Caroline of Hesse-Rotenburg (1714–1741); married Louis Henri, Duke of Bourbon, and had issue.
 Constantine, Landgrave of Hesse-Rotenburg (1716–1778); his successor.
 Landgravine Christine of Hesse-Rotenburg (1717–1778); married Louis Victor, Prince of Carignan, and had issue.

Through his eldest daughter, his present descendants include the claimant Duke of Parma; the pretending King of the Two Sicilies and the reigning Grand Duke of Luxembourg. His youngest daughter is also an ancestress of the above.

1684 births
1749 deaths
People from Bad Schwalbach
House of Hesse-Kassel
17th-century German people
18th-century German people
Landgraves of Hesse-Rotenburg